Cruel jokes is a joke cycle dealing with cruelty and macabre topics. They belong to the category of sick humor. Typical examples:
- Mommy, why is daddy still sleeping?
- Shut up and keep digging.

- Mommy, why is daddy swimming so fast?
- Shut up and reload.

In American culture jokes of this kind were recorded as early as in 1930s as the Little Audrey jokes, with a larger cycle reported during 1950s, many with the "Shut up..." punch line. Sutton-Smith remarks that the macabre of these jokes may also be compared with even earlier 19th century Little Willie rhymes: "Little Willie with his thirst for gore / Nailed his mommy's baby to the door". The origin of Little Willie poetry and other sick humour is attributed to the 1899 book Ruthless Rhymes for Heartless Homes by a minor poet Harry Graham.

A significant part of them was focused on the in-family antagonism, stressing the unlove and violence. Joseph Boskin attributes them to the increased anxiety within families due to severe societal changes: two working parents, frequent relocations, increase in marital separation and divorce.

In 1960 Brian Sutton-Smith  classified the 155 collected "cruel" jokes into categories of murder of friend or relative, mutilation, cannibalism, corpses, beasts, excrement, degenerate parents, indifference to young, afflictions/disease/mutilation, religion, famous people. He noted that at this time there was no established name for these jokes and they were variously called Cruel Jokes, Bloody Marys, Hate Jokes, Ivy League Jokes, Sadist Jokes, Gruesomes, Grimsels, Sick Jokes, Freddie Jokes, Depression Jokes, Meanie Jokes, and Comedy of Horror. The collected jokes appear to originate during the 1950s and come both from American and British sources. 

Sutton-Smith notices the major novelty: all mishaps with Little Audrey (being cooked, crushed, broken, etc.) were due to accidents, while in cruel jokes the macabre acts are intentional.

Roger Abrahams pointed out the terse  "vignette" form of the joke, akin to a caption to a cartoon and noticed that some of them have already been known in a more narrative form. "Son, will you quit kicking your sister" - "Oh, that's all right. She's already dead". Compare with: "The boy was walking down the street kicking a baby. A policeman walked up to him and said. 'What are you doing here?' - 'I am kicking the baby down the street'. - 'You are what?' - 'Oh, that's all right, he's dead.'" 

Abrahams noted that this kind of anti-taboo jokes is a society-level check against the excessive repressiveness of the societal norms.

See also
Dead baby jokes
Black comedy

Footnotes

References
Encyclopedia of Humor Studies, ed. Salvatore Attardo, 2014, 

Joke cycles
Cruelty
Off-color humor